Sitting and Smiling is an endurance art performance by Benjamin Bennett. In a typical performance, Bennett looks into a video camera which is recording him while sitting and smiling motionless for four hours.

Bennett uploaded his first Sitting and Smiling video on July 28, 2014. Over the next several years, he uploaded similar videos at a rate of about one per week. Currently, his videos have earned more than 28 million views with over 330,000 subscribers.

Bennett cites Claire Bishop's 2012 Artificial Hells: Participatory Art and the Politics of Spectatorship as an inspiration for his art.

Walking and Talking 
On February 24, 2019, after reaching 300 Sitting and Smiling videos, Bennett began a new video series entitled Walking and Talking, in which he walks and talks continuously for four hours, or until his camera battery runs out. He speaks in an extemporaneous and reflexive manner, describing his subjective experience in real time, with subjects such as philosophy of mind, consciousness, and nonduality arising out of his self-reflection.

Incidents on stream 
During the fifth stream, a burglar attempted to make a scene of entering his home. When he was unable to open the door he said “Hello?”, then proceeded to shut the door and leave. This incident stacked attention online and the video currently has over 7.4 million views. 

In a separate incident in his 52nd livestream, Bennett clearly urinates himself, with a wet puddle seeping out from under him and gradually evaporating over the remainder of the footage. He never acknowledges this or breaks his composure and continues to sit and smile to the camera.

During streams 238 and 257, Bennett cries intermittently during the stream. He does seem to break composure a bit and makes sounds while crying, but then returns to sitting and smiling.

Critical response
One reviewer commented that "One of the strangest aspects of this project is its apparent lack of explanation."

Other reviewers said that the performance was "bizarre", "tip of the creepy iceberg", and "bonkers".

A writer for The Atlantic wrote:
Sitting and Smiling is, therefore, an extreme version of engagement with the present. It takes concepts like mindfulness (it is perhaps not coincidental that Bennett's cross-legged pose recalls the stance of meditation), attention to the present, and discomfort with the speed and busyness of modern life and pushes them to until they are unpleasant, even unbearable. ... By making the videos borderline unwatchable, Bennett suggests that experiencing time in a way that is unmediated, focused, and 'real' is impossible. But, of course, Bennett manages it, smiling the whole time.

See also 
 2 Hours Doing Nothing

References

External links
 Official Website
 Official Youtube Channel

Performances